Dominika Putto (born 22 June 1993) is a Polish sprint canoeist.

She competed at the 2021 ICF Canoe Sprint World Championships, winning a  medal in the K-2 200 m distance.

References

External links

1993 births
Living people
Polish female canoeists
ICF Canoe Sprint World Championships medalists in kayak
20th-century Polish women
21st-century Polish women